The Enid Masonic Temple (also known as Enid Symphony Center and the Knox Building), is a historic building in Enid, Oklahoma. It is the home of the Enid Symphony Orchestra, and was listed on the National Register of Historic Places in 1984. The Italian Renaissance Revival  building is also located within the Enid Downtown Historic District which became listed on the register in 2007.

History

The building was originally built in the 1920s as a meeting hall for several Garfield County Masonic lodges.  During the Great Depression, oilman Charles Knox bought the building (and renamed it the Knox Building). Knox instituted a rent increase that was too steep for the Freemasons, who vacated to other premises. The building was then closed, causing a forty-year period of vacancy. Local legend claims that the building is haunted by an elevator repairman named George, who had fallen to his death in the elevator shaft.

Enid Symphony Center
In the 1990s, the building was renovated and turned into the Enid Symphony Center.  Formed in 1905, the Enid Symphony Orchestra is the oldest in the state of Oklahoma. Under the leadership of Symphony director Doug Newell and the Enid Symphony Association, the fourth and fifth floors of the building were renovated in the 1990s at a cost of 3.2 million dollars. The renovations included the Enid Symphony Hall, a theatre hall with 1930s theatre seating, a lobby area with ancient Egyptian decor, Jane Champlin Art Gallery, and the Eleanor Hoehn Hornbaker Banquet Hall. In addition to being the home of Enid's orchestra, the Gaslight Theatre also holds a yearly dinner theatre production at the Enid Symphony Center.

References

Masonic buildings completed in 1924
Clubhouses on the National Register of Historic Places in Oklahoma
Former Masonic buildings in Oklahoma
Buildings and structures in Enid, Oklahoma
Concert halls in the United States
Italian Renaissance Revival architecture in the United States
Tourist attractions in Enid, Oklahoma
National Register of Historic Places in Garfield County, Oklahoma
Individually listed contributing properties to historic districts on the National Register in Oklahoma